The Battle of Sidi Semiane was a 4 hour combat during the Algerian War of Independence which took place on 20 May 1957 in the Dahra mountains in Wilaya IV.

The French army mobilized 850 soldiers to surprise attack 35 mujahideen of the Algerian National Liberation Front as revenge for the Algerian victory in the battle of Sidi Mohand Aklouche on 26 April 1957. The battle lasted more than 4 hours, and French commander Gaudion and his battalion suffered a heavy defeat which cost him more than 150 dead and more than 200 wounded, meanwhile the Algerians only lost two men, Si Slimane and Si Mahfoud.

References 

Conflicts in 1957
Battles of the Algerian War
1957 in France
1957 in Algeria